The Institute of Solid State Physics (ISSP) is one of over a dozen divisions comprising the Hefei Institutes of Physical Science, Chinese Academy of Sciences (CAS) situated in Hefei, Anhui. The ISSP was founded in March 1982 by the renowned scientist couple Ke T'ing-sui and He Yizhen; it now employs over 200 staff members, has combined facilities of over 25,000 square meters of laboratory space, and is a training base to over 200 graduate students in the fields of condensed matter physics, materials physics and chemistry.

The ISSP is research intensive in the areas of nano-materials technology, novel functional materials, computational physics, internal friction and defects of solids, materials physics under extreme environments, environmental and energy nanomaterials, nuclear engineering and special metallic materials. Most of its research is funded by the National Natural Science Foundation of China, the Chinese Academy of Sciences, the Natural Science Foundation of Anhui Province and the private sector. The ISSP also has close ties with the University of Science and Technology of China in both R&D and training of graduate students.

Research Laboratories 

 Laboratory of Internal Friction and Defects in Solids
 Laboratory for Computational Materials Sciences 
 Functional Materials Laboratory 
 Laboratory of Nanomaterials & Nanostructures 
 Applied Technology Laboratory of Materials
 Applied Technology Laboratory of Materials Nanomaterials
 Laboratory of Structure Research 
 Center for Energy Matter in Extreme Environments 
 Center for Environmental and Energy Nanomaterials

Notable people

 T. S. Kê - Pioneered the study of the dynamics of dislocations in solids and founder of the ISSP.
 He Yizhen - Pioneer of studies in amorphous physics and metal glasses in China and co-founder of the ISSP.
 Kong Qingping - Recipient of the 2014 Zener Medal

References

External links 
 Institute of Solid State Physics 
 Hefei Institutes of Physical Science 
 Chinese Academy of Sciences 

Research institutes of the Chinese Academy of Sciences
Physics institutes
University of Science and Technology of China
1982 establishments in China
Education in Hefei